Frank Joseph Guarini (born August 20, 1924) is an American Democratic Party politician, who represented New Jersey in the United States House of Representatives, where he represented the Fourteenth Congressional District for seven terms from 1979 to 1993. He is of Italian descent.

Early life and education
Guarini graduated from Lincoln High School in 1942. He served in the United States Navy aboard  from 1944 to 1946. Guarini received an A.B. from Dartmouth College, in 1947 and a J.D. from New York University School of Law in 1950 as well as an LL.M. in 1955. He pursued graduate work at The Hague Academy of International Law and was admitted to the New Jersey bar in 1951. He commenced practice in Jersey City.

Political career
Guarini served in the New Jersey Senate from 1965 to 1972. In 1970, Guarini unsuccessfully challenged incumbent U.S. Senator Harrison A. Williams in the Democratic Primary, losing 66%–34%.

Congress
Guarini was elected as a Democrat to the 96th and to the six succeeding Congresses (January 3, 1979 – January 3, 1993). He retired from Congress in 1993. His district number was eliminated following the 1990 Census, but in sense was succeeded by Bob Menendez in the renumbered 13th district.

Legacy

The Jersey City post office building on the corner of Montgomery and Washington has been dedicated to Guarini. John Cabot University in Rome, Italy, designated its campus as the Frank J. Guarini campus, and the library at New Jersey City University is also named in his honor.

He received the America Award of the Italy-USA Foundation in 2014.

Dartmouth has created the Frank J. Guarini Institute for International Education in recognition of his longtime support of the college. In 2018, Dartmouth further recognized him by announced the naming of the Guarini School of Graduate and Advanced Studies in his honor.

References

External links

 Official website of Frank J. Guarini

 

1924 births
American people of Italian descent
Living people
Dartmouth College alumni
The Hague Academy of International Law people
Lincoln High School (New Jersey) alumni
Democratic Party New Jersey state senators
Democratic Party members of the United States House of Representatives from New Jersey
Politicians from Jersey City, New Jersey
Military personnel from New Jersey
United States Navy officers
New York University School of Law alumni
United States Navy personnel of World War II